Nediam Nori Vargas Arteaga (born 5 September 1994) is a Venezuelan sprinter. She competed in the 100 metres at the 2015 World Championships in Beijing without advancing from the first round.

She is the current reigning South American champion at 100 metres.

Competition record

Personal bests
Outdoor
100 metres – 11.35 (0.5 m/s, Salamanca - España 2017)
200 metres – 23.07 (0.2 m/s, Ciudad Real - España 2017)

Indoor
60 metres – 7.58 (Braga 2016)

References

1994 births
Living people
Venezuelan female sprinters
Place of birth missing (living people)
World Athletics Championships athletes for Venezuela
Athletes (track and field) at the 2015 Pan American Games
Athletes (track and field) at the 2019 Pan American Games
Pan American Games competitors for Venezuela
Central American and Caribbean Games gold medalists for Venezuela
Central American and Caribbean Games silver medalists for Venezuela
Competitors at the 2014 Central American and Caribbean Games
Competitors at the 2018 Central American and Caribbean Games
Central American and Caribbean Games medalists in athletics
21st-century Venezuelan women